Brida is a district in Laghouat Province, Algeria. It was named after its capital, Brida.

Municipalities
The district is further divided into 3 municipalities:

Brida
Hadj Mechri
Taouiala. In Taouïala (تاوياله), located in the Amour Range to the southeast of Aflou, there is an ecotouristic village.

References

Districts of Laghouat Province

ar:بريدة (الأغواط)